Ermin Sijamija (born 26 November 1974) is a Bosnian theatre, film and television actor. Most notably, he starred in the 2003 multiple award-winning Bosnian film Remake.

Filmography

Film

Television

References

External links
imdb.com

1974 births
Living people
People from Travnik
21st-century Bosnia and Herzegovina male actors